Lewis Wallbridge (November 27, 1816 – October 20, 1887) was a lawyer, judge and political figure in Canada West. In 1882, he was appointed Chief Justice of Manitoba.

He was born in Belleville in 1816. He studied at Upper Canada College, articled in law and was called to the bar in 1839. In 1855, he became a Queen's Counsel. In 1857, he was elected to represent Hastings South in the Legislative Assembly of the Province of Canada. He supported representation by population and opposed government subsidies to the Grand Trunk Railway. He was re-elected in 1861 and 1863. He was chosen as solicitor general in the 1863 government led by John Sandfield Macdonald and Antoine-Aimé Dorion and was chosen as speaker for the 8th Parliament of the Province of Canada. His brother, Thomas Campbell Wallbridge, represented Hastings North from 1863 to 1867. He did not run for election in 1867 and was an unsuccessful candidate for the House of Commons in Hastings West in 1878.

He was a director of the Bank of Upper Canada from 1862 to 1865.

He died in Winnipeg in 1887.

References 
 

1816 births
1887 deaths
Judges in Manitoba
Members of the Legislative Assembly of the Province of Canada from Canada West
Upper Canada College alumni
Canadian King's Counsel
Province of Canada judges